Austin Hall, also called Austin Manor, is a historic building in Delaware, Ohio. It was listed in the National Register of Historic Places on March 18, 1985. Originally built in 1923 on the campus of Ohio Wesleyan University, it was sold by the university in 2018.

References 

Residential buildings on the National Register of Historic Places in Ohio
Colonial Revival architecture in Ohio
Residential buildings completed in 1923
Buildings and structures in Delaware, Ohio
National Register of Historic Places in Delaware County, Ohio
1923 establishments in Ohio